Berberis argentinensis is a shrub in the  Berberidaceae described as a species in 1921. It is native to Bolivia (Tarija and La Paz regions) and Argentina (Tucumán and La Rioja Provinces).

References

argentinensis
Flora of South America
Plants described in 1921